Roman Dobeš (born 29 July 1978) is a Czech football player and currently plays for Viktoria Otrokovice.

External links
 

Czech footballers
1978 births
Living people
Czech First League players
FC Fastav Zlín players
1. FC Slovácko players
FK Bohemians Prague (Střížkov) players
FC Dinamo Tbilisi players
Association football midfielders
Sportspeople from Zlín